The Middle River is a stream in southwest Callaway County of central Missouri. It is a tributary to the Missouri River.

References

Rivers of Callaway County, Missouri
Rivers of Missouri